Hanggin or Hangjin Banner is a banner in southwest Inner Mongolia in the People's Republic of China. Occupying the northwest corner of the Ordos Loop, it is under the administration of Ordos Prefecture and is bordered by Dalad Banner to the east, Otog Banner to the southwest, and Bayan Nur to the north.

Geography
Most of Hanggin Banner is occupied by the northern half of the Ordos Desert. Its central basin formerly held the salt lake Dabasun Nor, whose salt was harvested and sold throughout the neighboring provinces during the Qing Dynasty.

Climate

References

External links
Official site 

Banners of Inner Mongolia
Ordos City